First Tuesday was a monthly television documentary strand, shown in the United Kingdom on the ITV network and was produced by Yorkshire Television. The subject matter was mainly social issues and current affairs stories from around the world. It ran from 5 April 1983 to 2 November 1993, with programmes being shown on the first Tuesday of the month, hence the title. In 1993, Network First was a part replacement for First Tuesday.

Notable programmes

 The Falklands War - The Untold Story (01/04/1987) 
 Too Close to Home (6 December 1988), about the Armley asbestos disaster
 The Wigan Hold (1989, filmed 1988), about wrestling at Riley's Gym, featuring former professional wrestlers and Riley's Gym alumni Tommy Moore and Ernie Riley (son of Billy Riley)
Four Hours in My Lai (02/05/1989 - shown in the US Frontline series as Remember My Lai) 
 Sonia's Baby (03/04/1990, narrated by Olivia O'Leary) 
 Swing Under the Swastika (02/10/1990, narrated by Alan Plater) 
 Cold Blood - The Massacre of East Timor (07/01/1992)   Amnesty International UK Media Awards Winner, 1992. 
 Katie and Eilish - Siamese Twins (04/08/1992, narrated by Julie Christie - 1993 Peabody Award winner) 
 M25, from 1991.

References

External links
 First Tuesday at the British Film Institute.

ITV documentaries
1983 British television series debuts
1993 British television series endings
1980s British documentary television series
1990s British documentary television series
Television series by Yorkshire Television
English-language television shows
Television series by ITV Studios